Tom Washington was an American Negro league catcher and manager.

Washington made his Negro leagues debut in 1905 with the Philadelphia Giants, and later briefly managed the team. He played his final professional season with Philadelphia in 1915.

References

External links
  and Seamheads

Place of birth missing
Place of death missing
Year of birth missing
Year of death missing
Negro league baseball managers
Philadelphia Giants players